The Ambassador of Argentina to the United States is the Ambassador Extraordinary and Plenipotentiary of the Argentine Republic to the United States of America.

The Ambassador is Argentina's foremost diplomatic representative to the United States, and Chief of Mission in Washington, D.C.

History
Diplomatic relations have existed between the United States and Argentina at the ambassadorial level since December 27, 1823, when Caesar Augustus Rodney, President James Monroe's envoy, presented his credentials to the government of Martín Rodríguez.

In 1832, when Juan Manuel de Rosas came to power in Argentina, he appointed Carlos María de Alvear as minister to the United States to resolve a conflict between the two governments in the Falkland Islands.

Chiefs of mission

Ministers
1824–1835: Carlos María de Alvear
1838–1864: Carlos María de Alvear
1863–1868: Domingo Faustino Sarmiento
1868–1870: 
1880–1881: 
1881–1884: Luis Lorenzo Domínguez
1884–1885: Carlos Carranza
1885–1890: 
1890–1892: Roque Sáenz Peña
1892–1893:  
1893–1895: Estanislao Zeballos
1895–1896: Vicente J. Domínguez
1896–1899:  
1899–1900: Antonio del Viso
1900–1901: Eduardo Wilde
1901–1901: Antonio del Viso
1901–1905: Martín García Mérou
1905–1910: Epifanio Portela
1910–1914: Rómulo Sebastián Naón

Ambassadors

1914–1919: Rómulo Sebastián Naón
1919–1922: Tomás Le Breton
1922–1924: Felipe Aja Espil
1924–1928: Honorio Pueyrredon
1928–1928: Conrado Traverso
1928–1928: Felipe Aja Espil
1928–1928: Julian Enciso
1928–1928: Manuel Malbrán
1928–1928: Julian Enciso
1928–1931: Manuel Malbrán
1931–1943: Felipe Aja Espil
1944–1944: Adrián César Escobar
1944–1945: No representative
1945–1945: Rodolfo Garcia Arias
1945–1945: Oscar Ibarra García
1945–1946: Luis Santiago Luti
1946–1948: Oscar Ivanissevich
1948–1948: Martín Luis Drago
1948–1951: Jerónimo Remorino
1951–1955: Hipólito Jesús Paz
1955–1957: Adolfo Ángel Vicchi
1957–1958: Mauricio Yadarola
1958–1959: César Barros Hurtado
1959–1962: Emilio Donato del Carril
1962–1964: Roberto Alemann
1964–1966: Norberto Miguel Barrenechea
1966–1968: Álvaro Alsogaray
1968–1970: Eduardo A. Roca
1970–1971: Pedro Eduardo Real
1971–1973: Carlos Manuel Muñiz
1973–1975: Alejandro José Luis Orfila
1975–1976: Rafael Maximiliano Vázquez
1976–1976: Arnaldo T. Musich
1977–1981: Jorge Antonio Aja Espil
1981–1982: Esteban Arpad Takacs
1982–1986: Lucio García del Solar
1986–1989: Enrique Candioti
1989–1991: Guido Di Tella
1991–1993: Carlos Ortiz de Rozas
1993–1997: Raúl Granillo Ocampo
1997–1999: Diego Ramiro Guelar
2000–2002: Guillermo Enrique González
2002–2003: Diego Ramiro Guelar
2003–2003: Eduardo Amadeo
2003–2008: José Octavio Bordón
2008–2010: Héctor Timerman
2010–2011: Alfredo Chiaradía
2011–2013: Jorge Argüello
2013–2015: Cecilia Nahón
2015–2017: Martín Lousteau
2017–2019: Fernando Oris de Roa
2020–present: Jorge Argüello

See also

 Embassy of Argentina, Washington, D.C.
 United States Ambassador to Argentina
 Argentina – United States relations

References

Argentina
United States